Baztin (also Romanized as Bāztīn; also known as Bāst and Bāstīn) is a village in Liravi-ye Miyani Rural District, Imam Hassan District, Deylam County, Bushehr Province, Iran. At the 2006 census, its population was 92, in 19 families.

References 

Populated places in Deylam County